The 2013 Yinzhou Bank Ningbo International Women's Tennis Open was a professional tennis tournament played on hard courts. It was the fourth edition of the tournament which was part of the 2013 WTA 125K series. It took place in Ningbo, China, on 22–27 September 2013.

Women's singles entrants

Seeds 

 1 Rankings as of 16 September 2013

Other entrants 
The following players received wildcards into the singles main draw:
  Han Xinyun
  Wang Qiang
  Zhang Yuxuan
  Zheng Saisai

The following players received entry from the qualifying draw:
  Petra Cetkovská
  Richèl Hogenkamp
  Katarzyna Piter
  Wang Yafan

Women's doubles entrants

Seeds

Other entrants 
The following players received wildcards into the doubles draw:
  Sun Xuliu /  Zheng Wushuang

Champions

Singles 

  Bojana Jovanovski def.  Shuai Zhang 6–7(7–9), 6–4, 6–1

Doubles 

  Chan Yung-jan /  Zhang Shuai def.  Irina Buryachok /  Oksana Kalashnikova 6–2, 6–1

External links 
 2013 Ningbo International Women's Tennis Open at wtatennis.com

2013 WTA 125K series
2013
Hard court tennis tournaments
2013 in Chinese tennis